Crawford railway station is a Metrorail station that serves the suburbs of Rondebosch East and Crawford in Cape Town, South Africa. It is served by trains on the Cape Flats Line.

The station, which is located between First Avenue in Rondebosch East and Allister Road in Crawford, has two side platforms and a station building at ground level on the west side of the tracks. The platforms are connected by two pedestrian subways.

Notable places nearby
 College of Cape Town Crawford campus

Railway stations in Cape Town
Metrorail Western Cape stations